Daniel Bichlmann (born 18 August 1988) is a German professional racing cyclist, who currently rides for UCI Continental team . He rode in the men's team time trial at the 2016 UCI Road World Championships.

Major results
2014
 8th Overall Tour du Cameroun
1st Stage 5
2021 
 1st  Overall Tour du Faso
1st Stage 5

References

External links
 

1988 births
Living people
German male cyclists
People from Traunstein (district)
Sportspeople from Upper Bavaria
Cyclists from Bavaria
21st-century German people